Gordy Morgan (born August 12, 1966) is an American wrestler.  He wrestled in the 74kg weight class at the 1996 Olympics, finishing ninth, and was a 1990 and 1993–95 world team member. He was a 3-time National Greco-Roman champion (1991, 1993, 1994).  
In NCAA competition, he was the 1989 Big Ten champion in the 158 pound class and an NCAA All-American.  He was also a 1985 Minnesota State High School champion in the 155 pound class.

In 2004, the Minnesota Wrestling Coaches Association inducted Morgan into the Dave Bartelma Hall of Fame

In 2006, Morgan was named USA Wrestling FILA Junior/University Person of the Year for his commitment to the sport and development of wrestlers.

Early life

Morgan was born in Bloomington, Minnesota and attended Kennedy High School in Bloomington and the University of Minnesota, where he graduated with a degree in business.

References

1966 births
Living people
American male sport wrestlers
Olympic wrestlers of the United States
Wrestlers at the 1996 Summer Olympics
Pan American Games medalists in wrestling
Pan American Games bronze medalists for the United States
Wrestlers at the 1995 Pan American Games
20th-century American people
21st-century American people